The Flight in the Night (German: Die Flucht in die Nacht) is a 1926 German silent film directed by Amleto Palermi and starring Conrad Veidt, Robert Scholz and Angelo Ferrari. It was based on the play Henry IV by Luigi Pirandello. The art direction was by Hermann Warm. It was shot on location in Italy.

Cast
 Conrad Veidt as Heinrich IV
 Angelo Ferrari as Graf di Nolli
 Robert Scholz as Baron Belcredi, Schurke
 Paul Biensfeldt as Diener
 Oreste Bilancia as Raso
 Agnes Esterhazy as ältliche Matrone
 Enrica Fantis as Maria
 Carl Geppert as Bediensteter
 John Gottowt as Bediensteter
 Georg John as Bediensteter
 Hermann Vallentin as Irrenarzt, Prof. Genoni
 Hertha von Walther

References

Bibliography
 Bock, Hans-Michael & Bergfelder, Tim. The Concise CineGraph. Encyclopedia of German Cinema. Berghahn Books, 2009.
 Soister, John T. & Battle, Pat Wilks. Conrad Veidt on Screen: A Comprehensive Illustrated Filmography. McFarland, 2002.

External links

1926 films
Films of the Weimar Republic
German silent feature films
Films directed by Amleto Palermi
Films shot in Italy
German films based on plays
Films based on works by Luigi Pirandello
Films about amnesia
German black-and-white films